The Sherman Booth House is a Prairie Style house designed by architect Frank Lloyd Wright in Glencoe, IL. The house was built as the primary residence for the family of Elizabeth K and Sherman M Booth II in 1916.  Sherman Booth II was an attorney at the time for Wright.  The house is the largest of six Wright-designed Prairie Style homes in the Ravine Bluffs Development.

Wright had originally designed a grander vision for the Booths in 1911 (known as Scheme 1), but due to the exorbitant cost ($125,000 in 1910) and a financial downturn in the Booths fortunes, he redesigned two existing structures in the design that was built (Scheme 2).

Architecture 

The house has a square theme throughout including square door knobs.  Unique to most Prairie styles homes at the time, the building is three stories high and has a rooftop deck, a rarity for Wright.  Wright designed several pieces of furniture for the house including a dining room table/chairs,  a library table, slatted wooden light sconces and a floor lamp reminiscent of a Japanese art print holder.

References 

Frank Lloyd Wright buildings
Glencoe, Illinois
Historic American Engineering Record in Illinois
Houses in Cook County, Illinois
Houses completed in 1915
1915 establishments in Illinois